India is a union of twenty-eight states and Eight union territories. As of 2011, with an estimated population of 1.210 billion, India is the world's second most populated country after the People's Republic of China. India occupies 2.4 percent of the world's land surface area but is home to 17.5 percent of the world's population. The Indo-Gangetic plains are among the most densely populated areas of the world. The eastern and western coastal regions of Deccan traps are also densely populated regions of India. The Thar desert in western Rajasthan is one of the most densely populated deserts in the world. The northern and north-eastern states along the Himalayas contain cold arid deserts with fertile valleys. These states have less population density due to indomitable physical barriers.

Census of India
The first population census in  India was conducted in 1873. Since then the a decennial census has been conducted in 1881, 1891, 1901, 1911, 1921, 1931, and 1941 by the Government. Since India's independence in 1947, a census has been carried out every 10 years by the Indian Government, starting from 1951. The census in India is carried out by the Office of the Registrar General and Census Commissioner under the Ministry of Home Affairs, and is one of the largest administrative tasks conducted by a federal government.

Latest population figures are based on data from the 2011 census of India. During the decade of 2001–2011, India's annual population rising rate has slowed down from 2.15 to 1.76. Based on decennial census data, Dadra and Nagar Haveli shows the highest growth rate of 55.5 percent. It is followed by Daman and Diu (53.5 percent), Meghalaya (27.8 percent) and Arunachal Pradesh (25.9 percent). Nagaland recorded the lowest growth rate of -0.5 percent.

India has 641,000 inhabited villages and 72.2 percent of the total population reside in these rural areas. Of them, 145,000 villages have a population size of 500–999 persons; 130,000 villages have a population size of 1000–1999 and 128,000 villages have a population size of 200–499. There are 3,961 villages that have a population of 10,000 persons or more. India's 27.8 percent urban population lives in more than 5,100 towns and over 380 urban agglomerations. In the decade of 1991–2001, migration to major cities caused a rapid increase in urban population. On the basis of net migrants by last residence during the past decade, Maharashtra had the most immigration with 2.3 million, followed by the National Capital Territory of Delhi (1.7 million), Gujarat (0.68 million) and Haryana (0.67 million). Uttar Pradesh (−2.6 million) and Bihar (−1.7 million) topped the list for interstate emigration. The four states of Uttar Pradesh, Maharashtra, Bihar, West Bengal and  account for almost half (48.89 percent) of the total Indian population.

By past population (1947 to 2022)

As per census data 2011, the total population of India is: 1,210,193,422.

See also 

 List of Indian states and union territories by GDP
 Demographics of India
 List of metropolitan areas in India
 Census of India prior to independence
 2011 Census of India

References

External links 
Official Website of Census of India

India, population

bn:জনসংখ্যা অনুযায়ী ভারতের রাজ্য ও কেন্দ্রশাসিত অঞ্চলগুলির তালিকা
fr:Classement des États et territoires indiens par population
ga:Liosta stáit na hIndia de réir a ndaonra
gl:Lista de estados da India por poboación
hi:जनसंख्या के आधार पर भारत के राज्य और संघ क्षेत्र
id:Daftar negara bagian India menurut jumlah penduduk
kn:ಭಾರತದ ರಾಜ್ಯಗಳ ಜನಸಂಖ್ಯೆ
hu:India tagállamainak listája népesség szerint
mr:भारतीय राज्ये व केंद्रशासित प्रदेश यांची सूची लोकसंख्येनुसार
sv:Lista över Indiens delstater efter folkmängd
ta:மக்கள்தொகை அடிப்படையில் இந்திய மாநிலங்களின் பட்டியல்
te:భారతదేశ రాష్ట్రాల జనాభా
vi:Danh sách bang của Ấn Độ theo dân số
wuu:印度行政区人口列表